Ronald Victor James (23 May 1920 – 28 April 1983) was an Australian cricketer. He played 45 first-class matches for New South Wales and South Australia between 1938/39 and 1950/51.

See also
 List of New South Wales representative cricketers

References

External links
 

1920 births
1983 deaths
Australian cricketers
New South Wales cricketers
South Australia cricketers
Cricketers from Sydney